Litopenaeus setiferus (also accepted: Penaeus setiferus, and known by various common names including Atlantic white shrimp, white shrimp, gray shrimp, lake shrimp, green shrimp, green-tailed shrimp, blue-tailed shrimp, rainbow shrimp, Daytona shrimp, Mayport Shrimp, common shrimp, southern shrimp, and, in Mexico) is a species of prawn found along the Atlantic coast of North America and in the Gulf of Mexico. It was the subject of the earliest shrimp fishery in the United States.

Distribution
The range of L. setiferus extends from Fire Island, New York to Ciudad Campeche, Mexico.

Description
The antennae may be up to three times the length of the body, which is bluish white with a tinge of pink on the sides, and black spots. The pleopods are often redder, and the uropods and telson are green. The rostrum is long and thin, with 5–11 teeth on the upper edge and 2 on the lower edge, and continues along the carapace as a dorsal carina (ridge). Deep grooves alongside the carine separate the related species Farfantepenaeus aztecus ("brown shrimp") and Farfantepenaeus duorarum ("pink shrimp") from L. setiferus.

Ecology
Litopenaeus setiferus is an omnivore; in Lake Pontchartrain, it feeds chiefly on the seagrass Vallisneria americana and detritus. Many aquatic animals feed on L. setiferus, including fish such as red drum (Sciaenops ocellatus) and turtles such as the loggerhead sea turtle (Caretta caretta).

Life cycle
Spawning in L. setiferus occurs while the water is warm, between the increase in water temperatures in the spring and the sudden decline in temperature in the fall. Males attach a spermatophore to the females, which is then used to fertilize the eggs as they are released.

Spring rains flush the shrimp out into the ocean. In the Eastern United States, shrimp then migrate south towards warmer waters.

Fishery
Subsistence fishing for prawns was carried out by Native Americans along the Atlantic coast. This knowledge was passed on to European settlers, and Litopenaeus setiferus became the subject of the earliest shrimp fishery in the United States, with commercial fishery for L. setiferus starting as early as 1709.

The harvesting for L. setiferus began in the 1950s and since that time is collected monthly throughout Gulf of Mexico.

Notes

Other references
White shrimp NOAA FishWatch. Retrieved 4 November 2012.

Penaeidae
Edible crustaceans
Commercial crustaceans
Crustaceans of the Atlantic Ocean
Crustaceans described in 1767
Taxa named by Carl Linnaeus